AveDesk is a freeware (although it is touted as "Donationware", which means the software is solely donation-supported in terms of financing) widget engine for Windows XP that runs small, self-contained widgets called "desklets", as well as ObjectDock "docklets" (small plugins intended for use by ObjectDock and other similar programs), and is created by Andreas Verhoeven, a freelance software programmer.

Unlike most other software programs of its kind, AveDesk is heavily community driven. A dedicated section of the forums on Aqua-Soft, an online community of skinning enthusiasts dedicated to emulating the look and feel of Mac OS X Leopard, is used by users of the software to report bugs or request for new software features directly to the programmer, cutting any red tape in the way. New features are also better discussed among the users of the software program and the programmer himself.

The "Ave" in "AveDesk" is a shortened version of the author's name, Andreas Verhoeven.

Features
AveDesk desklets are skinnable plugins developed in Visual C++ that can display themselves as widgets, rather than just simply script files. One advantage is that the desklets can have its entire appearance more easily changed to suit the tastes of its users, rather than having to create an entirely new desklet, as in most other widget engines. However, due to the same reason, users cannot easily create custom-made desklets for AveDesk as other similar programs (such as Konfabulator and DesktopX). To work around this, AveDesk users usually use a plugin called SysStats, which allow users to easily create and run desklets for AveDesk using scripts (such as JavaScript and VBScript), coupled with specially structured INI files and computer image files that make up the look and functionality of the widget.

With the release of version 1.3 of AveDesk, a new scripting engine, called AveScripter, will be developed to take advantage of the updated internal architecture of desklets. The engine is more closely integrated with AveDesk, and is able to take advantage of the internal features that come with the new version, such as visual effects included with AveDesk and a special library of graphical user interface controls intended for AveDesk desklets, called AveControls.

Desklets
AveDesk is mainly used by Windows users emulating the look and feel of Mac OS X. This can be seen in the default set of desklets included in the program. Some of the more commonly used ones include:

A "PidlShortcut" desklet (the most popular among the default set of desklets in AveDesk), a skinnable shortcut desklet that can point to a computer file or folder, but with customisable looks and functions and the ability to use a high-resolution PNG image as an icon for the shortcut (instead of the usual low-resolution Windows icon), as well as to provide additional information, such as the number of files in the folder or the size of the disk drive,
A skinnable "iTunesDesklet" desklet (also known as "AveTunes"), which is an iTunes remote control, similar in functionality to its Mac OS X's Dashboard counterpart, but can have its appearance changed through skins, and
A "StickyNotes" desklet, which can hold simple notes and is very similar to the Stickies widget in Mac OS X's Dashboard. This desklet is an updated replacement for the "Notes" desklet found in earlier versions of AveDesk.
A "Translator" desklet, which uses an online language translator to translate text from one language to another, and is similar to its Mac OS X's Dashboard's counterpart, but can have its appearance changed through skins. Among the languages supported are the more commonly spoken languages in Europe (such as English, French and German), as well as Chinese, Korean and Japanese.

Version 1.3 of AveDesk adds several new internal features as mentioned earlier, and a few new desklets were made to take advantage of them. In addition to the "Translator" and "StickyNotes" desklets (which were added in version 1.3) described above, two other desklets worth mentioning are:

A "ChalkBoard" desklet. Essentially a simple electronic drawing pad, a user can use a mouse to write or draw on the pad. The user can choose between five drawing colours and three pen sizes.
A "WordSearcher" desklet, which allows a user to search either an online dictionary or thesaurus. The desklet's colour changes to green if an entry is found, and red if it is unable to find the entry.
Note that this is not an exhaustive list of all the desklets included with AveDesk.

Features
Among the features of AveDesk not usually found in other widget engines are:

An installer feature. New users are easily confused with the correct installation of new desklets. To work around this, desklet creators can create specially pre-packaged desklets (which are actually ZIP files with the correct directory structure and instructions for the software program). Users need only to open the package with AveDesk, which will then automatically and correctly install the desklets for the user.
Modules, which extend the functionality of the software program itself. These modules act as plugins to the AveDesk program itself, and are not desklets or widgets. Modules provide additional functionality such as the ability to show or hide "PidlShortcut" desklets that point to specific disk drives as they are mounted or dismounted, or to automatically hide all normal desktop icons when the program is started.
A themes feature. This feature allows a user of AveDesk to save the configurations and positions of AveDesk desklets he or she has running on the desktop, so if the user wishes to go back to that configuration in the future, he or she only needs to load that theme into AveDesk, saving the hassle of rearranging and reconfiguring the desklets. This feature came about after some users of earlier versions voiced the need to use multiple configurations of AveDesk desklets.
Showcase. Similar to Konfabulator's Konsposé, and patterned after Mac OS X's Dashboard and Exposé, this feature quickly brings AveDesk desklets to the foreground, with the background dimmed. The user can set the hotkeys used to activate ShowCase, as well as setting the "dimness" of the background.
The ability to add custom visual effects to desklets, and to create new ones using specially crafted scripts. Unlike other widget engines, where visual effects are limited to the scope of the widgets, users can add their own visual effects onto AveDesk desklets, separate from the desklet. Many of the effects mimic the animations present on Mac OS X, but a few effects were unique to AveDesk, which some cross-platform users using the software application feel are better than their counterparts on Mac OS X.
A control panel. Instead of a context menu listing all open widgets (as in most other widget engines), AveDesk uses a control panel for centralised desklet management. The control panel list all currently open desklets (along with a "live" thumbnail image of the desklet), as well as a menu bar. From there, a user can open and close desklets, configure AveDesk's options, set the defaults for new AveDesk desklets, switch or create new AveDesk themes, or install and manage modules. Like other widget engines, however, AveDesk does place an icon in the taskbar, but it does not contain a list of running desklets. Its main purpose is to activate the control panel, to switch themes, and to shut down the program itself.
ObjectDock docklet support. Highly unusual for widget engines, AveDesk not only support its own plugin formats, but plugin formats of other applications that uses plugins (in this case, ObjectDock). One could run an ObjectDock docklet inside AveDesk as if it were an AveDesk desklet.
Labels and sublabels. Each AveDesk desklet can have its own label, which the user can change. Some desklets makes heavy use of this feature, such as the "PidlShortcut" desklet; the labels provide the name of the file or folder it is pointing to, and the sublabels can provide additional information about the file or folder. Sublabels were added in version 1.1 to allow such shortcut desklets to more closely mimic their Mac OS X counterparts, which has this feature for all icons. This feature exists in the first place because ObjectDock docklets (which AveDesk can support, as described above) usually emanate information through labels, as well as the icon representing the docklet itself.

History
AveDesk was actually a spinoff of another different software project. Originally, Andreas Verhoeven (who was then a creator of ObjectDock docklets) was developing a program that could run ObjectDock docklets in Y'z Dock (a now-defunct program that was similar to ObjectDock) and vice versa, in order to resolve incompatibilities between the two programs. Instead, he managed to have ObjectDock docklets running on the desktop, independent of ObjectDock (hence the support for ObjectDock docklets). From there, he began further developing the idea that eventually led to AveDesk. During its development, he coined the term "desklets" to describe the widgets of AveDesk (as desklets are to computer desktops as docklets are to dock programs such as ObjectDock).

In late 2003, Andreas released AveDesk 1.0 on the Aqua-Soft online community. Soon after, a number of desklets intended just for AveDesk appeared. Some of the more notable desklets that helped propel AveDesk's popularity was a simple but skinnable shortcut desklet (the predecessor to the "PidlShortcut" desklet), that can be easily customised to take on the look and feel of Mac OS X desktop shortcuts but complete with functioning Windows context menus, a disk drive desklet (similar to the shortcut desklet) that could be set to appear only when that particular disk drive has been mounted, and a Trash can desklet that has the additional functions of ejecting a CD or DVD disk drive when its icon has been dragged onto it. These desklets helped to increase the appeal of AveDesk to skinning enthusiasts who wanted to emulate the look and feel of Mac OS X.

In late 2004, Andreas released version 1.1 of AveDesk to an eager audience of skinning enthusiasts, who had previously been teased with screenshots of the new version of AveDesk while it was in development. Users who installed the new version were greeted with improved desklets and new, custom visual effects (as described above). These visual effects further increased the appeal of AveDesk, and version 1.1 was embraced heartily by skinning enthusiasts, making it one of the more popular widget engines for Windows, along with already popular widget engines at that time (such as DesktopX).

In early 2005, version 1.2 of AveDesk was released. Version 1.2 was one of the biggest (if not the biggest) update to AveDesk. Many new features were added to this version, with some of them requested by users of earlier versions; the themes and installer features, as well as Showcase were among the features new to the release. The various shortcut desklets were also replaced by a new, updated "PidlShortcut" desklet, bringing together and improving on the functions and quality of the shortcut desklets it displaced. Additional visual effects, such as improved shadows for the text on each desklet's label and fade-in/fade-out effects, were also added.

On October 26, 2005, Avedesk version 1.3 was released. This version was originally intended to be a minor update to iron out some quirks in previous versions of AveDesk, but it eventually became one of the biggest update to be rolled out. Several new features were incorporated into the release, such as additional hardware-accelerated visual effects when closing or configuring each desklet, along with improved desklets, some of which were described above.

Currently, the software program is at version 1.4 which added support for Windows Vista.

External links
Homepage
Home of the SysStats widgets
Home of AveScripter & other popular widgets

Windows-only software
Widget engines